George Erwin Mojica Garcia is a Filipino lawyer serving as the Chairperson of the Commission on Elections since July 22, 2022. He formerly served as a Commissioner of the Commission on Elections from March 8, 2022 to June 1, 2022.

References 

Living people
21st-century Filipino lawyers
Chairpersons of the Commission on Elections of the Philippines
Year of birth missing (living people)
People from Cavite
Commissioners of constitutional commissions of the Philippines